WYJJ-LD (channel 27) is a low-power television station in Jackson, Tennessee, United States, affiliated with several digital multicast networks (including Court TV on its main channel). The station is owned by Innovate Corp., and maintains a transmitter on Radio Road on Jackson's north side. Despite similar call letters, the television station is not, by any means, related to Trenton-licensed radio station WYJJ (97.7 FM).

History

Although granted a construction permit in late summer 2012, it was still silent, and not ready to go on the air. The construction permit was granted under the call sign W27DR-D, and then WADR-LD starting in May 2013.

In December 2013, DTV America Corporation announced that they would launch WADR-LD and three other stations to carry MyNetworkTV programming, with programming from another network surrounding the MyNetworkTV prime time schedule on weeknights. WADR was selected to carry Soul of the South as a primary affiliation and MyNetworkTV as their secondary affiliation.

The station finally took to the air in January or February 2014 on UHF channel 27. In May 2014, this station changed the call letters to the current WYJJ-LD. The transmitter was located on the south side of Jackson just off U.S. Route 45. DTV America entered a strategic partnership with Forever Communications to operate WYJJ-LD.

Before the station's launch, Jackson, Tennessee relied on the second subchannel of CW affiliate WLMT in Memphis for MyNetworkTV and a more close-to-complete complete MeTV schedule. MeTV is now available on WBBJ-DT4, a subchannel of ABC affiliate WBBJ-TV. 

Now, with WYJJ-LD on the air, ABC and CBS offered through WBBJ's main channel and DT3 subchannels, respectively, and WJKT being the Jackson, Tennessee-area Fox affiliate, Jackson now offers every major network in their market except for the Ion Television syndicated programming service. In October 2014, a new NBC affiliate signed on in the Jackson TV market via a new television station (WNBJ-LD, channel 39), and is now available on Jackson Energy Authority Cable and Dish Network. Before the sign on of WNBJ, distant NBC affiliates WMC-TV in Memphis and WSMV-TV in Nashville were the default NBC affiliates for Jackson, Tennessee. As for The CW, WLMT remained the default over-the-air CW affiliate, since the area is served by cable-exclusive CW Plus outlet "WBJK" on cable channels 2 and 21, depending on which cable company serves the consumer. WNBJ's DT2 subchannel would launch a CW-affiliated subchannel in 2018.

After the first year 
On May 5, 2015, the station's primary affiliation was changed to Antenna TV, with MyNetworkTV programming remaining in the primetime schedule. In June 2015, Doctor TV programming was relocated to a new third digital subchannel; the DT2 subchannel is now occupied by Bounce TV, an African American-oriented digital network. Also in summer 2015, WYJJ-LD became available on the cable system of Jackson Energy Authority (JEA), branded as EPlus Broadband Cable. WYJJ's main subchannel can now be viewed on JEA EPlus channel 14, while DrTV on WYJJ-LD3 can be viewed on channel 193. On Monday, November 23, WYJJ added a fourth subchannel carrying religious programming from the Sonlife Broadcasting Network.

On January 29, 2016, WYJJ added a fifth subchannel carrying Grit, which broadcast entertainment programming aimed towards men. In spite of the existence of WYJJ-LD5, The Grit feed from WMC-DT3 remains on JEA Cable. WMC-DT2's feed of Bounce TV also remains on cable in Jackson as well.

Under new ownership
WYJJ was one of several dozen DTV America stations that would be purchased by HC2 Holdings (now a part of Innovate Corp.) in October 2017. Two months later, WYJJ began simulcasting the MyNetworkTV schedule as aired on the second subchannel of Rehoboth Beach, Delaware NBC affiliate WRDE-LD. In Spring 2019, the MyNetworkTV schedule was simulcast from KWWE-LD of Lake Charles, Louisiana.

On June 3, 2019, WYJJ's Antenna TV affiliation was dropped to become affiliated with the then-recently-launched Court TV network, with the MyNetworkTV affiliation meanwhile remaining intact. In September 2019, WYJJ ended its affiliation with MyNetworkTV to carry Court TV full-time. MyNetworkTV moved its affiliation in Jackson, Tennessee to a secondary affiliation alongside H&I on the third subchannel of WNBJ-LD.

Programming
WYJJ-LD broadcasts one network 22 hours every weekday, and all 48 hours of the weekend, and programming from another network from 7-9 p.m. CT every weeknight, a similar practice to those of WYJJ's sister stations, WCZU-LD in Bowling Green, Kentucky and KPJO-LD in Joplin, Missouri. Court TV network programming is shown in all parts of the weekend and for 22 hours every weekday. WYJJ airs MyNetworkTV programming on weeknights from 7 to 9 p.m., and would return to Court TV programming at 9 p.m. In September 2015, WYJJ-LD began broadcasting Atlantic Coast Conference football and men's basketball from the ad-hoc ACC Network, the syndicated programming service operated by Raycom Sports. It was previously on WNBJ-LD during the 2014-15 season.

Doctor TV, a healthy lifestyle-oriented network, was broadcast on WYJJ's DT2 subchannel until 2015, when Bounce TV launched on that subchannel, displacing DrTV to DT3. In January 2017, DrTV was replaced by Sony Pictures Television's GetTV network, and Cozi TV launched over a new DT7 subchannel. In February 2017, WYJJ's DT5 subchannel began broadcasting Heroes & Icons, and its DT6 subchannel began broadcasting Decades.

Subchannels
The station's digital signal is multiplexed:

References

 

YJJ-LD
Court TV affiliates
Bounce TV affiliates
GetTV affiliates
Cozi TV affiliates
Decades (TV network) affiliates
Low-power television stations in the United States
Television channels and stations established in 2014
2014 establishments in Tennessee
Innovate Corp.